The 1996 Workington Town season was the club's first season in the newly formed Super League. Coached by Ross O'Reilly, who replaced Kurt Sorensen in March 1996, and captained by Billy McGinty, Workington competed in Super League I and finished in 12th place, resulting in relegation to the First Division. The club also competed in the 1996 Challenge Cup, but were knocked out in the fourth round by First Division side Widnes.

Table

Match results

Super League

Challenge Cup

Squad

Transfers

In

Out

References

External links
Workington - Rugby League Project

Workington Town
Workington Town
English rugby league club seasons